Île de la Passe is an island of the Peros Banhos atoll in the Chagos Archipelago of the British Indian Ocean Territory.

References

Chagos Archipelago